Joel Hershman is an American film director, writer and producer.

Hershman is best known for the films Greenfingers starring Clive Owen and Helen Mirren and Hold Me, Thrill Me, Kiss Me starring Sean Young and Adrienne Shelly.

Filmography
1992: Hold Me, Thrill Me, Kiss Me
2000: Greenfingers

References

External links

American film directors
American male screenwriters
American film producers
English-language film directors
Living people
1958 births